The Anglo-Dane was a Danish automobile manufactured by H. C. Fredriksen of Copenhagen from 1902 to 1917. Fredriksen began by building bicycles in the 1890s; for these, he used British parts - hence the hyphenated name.

The first cars were light trucks with single-cylinder Belgian Kelecom engines.  Later cars were produced with their own design single-cylinder 4-5 hp engines; these featured friction drive using double discs to give an equivalent 12-speed transmission. A few passenger cars were also built with twin-cylinder engines before the company merged with automobile makers Jan and Thrige, which made Triangel commercial vehicles until 1945.  About 70 Anglo-Danes were made.

References

Brass Era vehicles
Car manufacturers of Denmark
Defunct motor vehicle manufacturers of Denmark
Goods manufactured in Denmark
1902 establishments in Denmark
Vehicle manufacturing companies established in 1902
Defunct manufacturing companies of Denmark